
Gmina Świerczów is a rural gmina (administrative district) in Namysłów County, Opole Voivodeship, in south-western Poland.

The gmina contains part of the protected area called Stobrawa Landscape Park.

Villages
Gmina Świerczów contains the villages and settlements of Bąkowice, Bielice, Biestrzykowice, Dąbrowa, Gola, Grodziec, Kuźnica Dąbrowska, Miejsce, Miodary, Pieczyska, Starościn, Świerczów, Wężowice and Zbica.

Neighbouring gminas
Gmina Świerczów is bordered by the gminas of Domaszowice, Lubsza, Namysłów, Pokój and Popielów.

References

Swierczow
Namysłów County